The 2016 German Masters (officially the 2016 918.com German Masters) was a professional ranking snooker tournament that took place between 3–7 February 2016 at the Tempodrom in Berlin, Germany. It was the fifth ranking event of the 2015/2016 season.

The defending champion Mark Selby lost 3–5 against Stephen Maguire in the last 16.

Martin Gould won the first ranking title of his professional career, defeating Luca Brecel 9–5 in the final. German referee Maike Kesseler officiated at her first ranking final.

Prize fund
The breakdown of prize money for this year is shown below:

Winner: €80,000
Runner-up: €35,000
Semi-final: €20,000
Quarter-final: €10,000
Last 16: €5,000
Last 32: €4,000
Last 64: €2,000

Televised highest break: €4,000
Total: €367,000

Main draw

Final

Qualifying
These matches were held between 17 and 20 December 2015 at the Robin Park Arena and Sports Centre in Wigan, England. All matches were best of 9 frames.

Round 1

Round 2

Century breaks

Qualifying stage centuries

 138, 108  Michael Wasley
 137, 131, 116  Marco Fu
 137, 122  Stephen Maguire
 136  Dominic Dale
 133  Anthony McGill
 131, 103  Alan McManus
 130, 107  Zhao Xintong
 130  Michael White
 129  Ian Burns
 128  Matthew Stevens
 127, 104  Robin Hull
 127, 102  Stuart Bingham
 127  Mark King
 126  Ronnie O'Sullivan
 124  Michael Holt
 122  Rod Lawler

 121, 102  Liang Wenbo
 121  Zhou Yuelong
 120  Thepchaiya Un-Nooh
 119  Barry Hawkins
 118, 111, 110  Shaun Murphy
 115, 108  Barry Pinches
 113, 108  John Higgins
 105, 100  Kurt Maflin
 104  Tian Pengfei
 104  Sam Craigie
 104  Fergal O'Brien
 104  Eden Sharav
 103  Neil Robertson
 103  Kyren Wilson
 102  Ali Carter
 102  Hossein Vafaei

Televised stage centuries

 125, 120, 109, 104  Judd Trump
 121  Mark Allen
 119, 105, 104  Mark Joyce
 113  Fergal O'Brien
 110, 104, 100  Martin Gould
 109  Stuart Bingham

 106  Marco Fu
 103  Mark King
 102  Graeme Dott
 102  Luca Brecel
 101  Kurt Maflin

References

External links

2016
2016 in snooker
Masters
February 2016 sports events in Germany
Sports competitions in Berlin